The 1897 Geneva Covenanters football team was an American football team that represented Geneva College as an independent during the 1897 college football season. Led by first-year head coach Ross Fiscus, Geneva compiled a record of 3–4–1.

Schedule

References

Geneva
Geneva Golden Tornadoes football seasons
Geneva Covenanters football